A shipping bandage, shipping boot, or shipping wrap, is a type of stable bandage or boot used on the lower legs of a horse to protect the animal while travelling in a horse trailer or other conveyance. The bandage starts just below the knee or hock, and ends at the floor, protecting the cannon bone, tendons of the lower leg, fetlock, pastern, coronet, and heels of the horse.  Some boot designs extend slightly above the knee and hock, offering protection to the joints in the event the horse bumps its upper legs on the sides of the trailer.

With the modern development of synthetic shipping boots made with hook-and-loop fasteners, most people choose this option as they are quicker to apply. A poorly applied shipping bandage is also more likely to fall off than a shipping boot. However, if correctly applied with good tension, safety pins, and masking tape, a shipping bandage will stay well in place.

Many horsemen believe that shipping bandages are superior to shipping boots, thinking they usually offer more protection than an ordinary shipping boot and tend to keep the circulation flowing in the lower leg. However, they can be detrimental if the person applying the bandage does not know how to do so properly, and may even injure the horse.  As a general rule, shipping boots are faster and safer to use, but for long journeys, properly applied shipping bandages provide superior support.

See also
Polo wraps
Stable bandage
Horse care

References

Horse management
Horse protective equipment